The Trinity Cathedral is a cathedral church, the oldest of all the remaining buildings in the Trinity Lavra of St. Sergius. It was built in 1422-1423 by St. Nikon of Radonezh to "honour and praise" the founder of the Trinity Lavra monastery St. Sergius of Radonezh. St. Sergius's relics are kept there. It's the main object of veneration in the Trinity Lavra. The cathedral was built from white stone. It is one of the most important examples of the early Moscow architecture. The Trinity Lavra's history started with the construction of this cathedral. The ancient wall painting, created by the famous painters Andrei Rublev and Daniel Chorny in 1425–1427, is lost. The remaining paintings were created in 1635. They reproduce the ancient iconography of the original. The main treasure of the cathedral is a five-tier iconostasis. Most of its icons were painted in the first third of the 15th century by Andrei Rublev and his colleagues. Both existing copies of Andrei Rublev's Trinity are kept in the iconostasis of the cathedral.

References

Links 
 
 Official website 

Russian Orthodox cathedrals in Russia
1423 establishments in Europe
15th-century Russian Orthodox church buildings
Churches in Moscow Oblast
Domes
Cultural heritage monuments of federal significance in Moscow Oblast